Victor Greenhalgh (1900–1983) was an Australian sculptor and teacher. He was commissioned to sculpt the King George V statue in Ballarat, Victoria, as well as eight of the portrait busts of Australian Prime Ministers which line the "Avenue of Prime Ministers" (aka Prime Ministers Avenue) in the Ballarat Botanical Gardens.

"Avenue of Prime Ministers" in the Botanical Gardens in Ballarat
Although eight busts were commissioned, not all appear on the avenue. For example, Greenhalgh was critical of the final casting of his bust of Malcolm Fraser, and after his death it was replaced by a new bust created by Peter Nicholson.

The eight busts include:
Sir Robert Menzies KT AK CH LLM QC (1894 – 1978)
Rt. Hon. Harold Holt (1908 – 1967)
John McEwen (1900 – 1980)
Sir John Gorton GCMG AC CH (1911 – 2002)
Sir William McMahon CH GCMG PC (1908 – 1988)
Gough Whitlam (1916 – 2014)
Malcolm Fraser (1930 – 2015)

The five busts which appear on the Avenue are:

Other Art works
Bust of Dick Richards
Marquette of Gough Whitlam
Martin-Weedon commemorative plaque
Mother and child

Educational achievements
Greenhalgh was head of the department of Advertising Art at RMIT. Bob Isherwood established the Victor Greenhalgh scholarship programme for underprivileged students at RMIT in his name.

References

1900 births
1983 deaths
20th-century Australian sculptors